Hippospongia is a genus of sponges belonging to the family Spongiidae.

The genus has almost cosmopolitan distribution.

Species 
The following species are accepted within Hippospongia:

 Hippospongia ammata de Laubenfels, 1954
 Hippospongia anfractuosa (Carter, 1885) 
 Hippospongia canaliculata (Lendenfeld, 1886) 
 Hippospongia cerebrum Lendenfeld, 1889
 Hippospongia communis (Lamarck, 1814) 
 Hippospongia cylindrica Lendenfeld, 1889
 Hippospongia densa Lendenfeld, 1889
 Hippospongia derasa Ridley, 1884
 Hippospongia elastica Lendenfeld, 1889
 Hippospongia fistulosa Lendenfeld, 1889
 Hippospongia galea (Lendenfeld, 1886) 
 Hippospongia gossypina (Duchassaing & Michelotti, 1864) 
 Hippospongia lachne (Laubenfels, 1936) 
 Hippospongia laxa Lendenfeld, 1889
 Hippospongia massa Lendenfeld, 1889
 Hippospongia mauritiana (Hyatt, 1877) 
 Hippospongia micropora (Lendenfeld, 1889) 
 Hippospongia mollissima (Lendenfeld, 1889) 
 Hippospongia multicia Wiedenmayer in Hooper & Wiedenmayer, 1994
 Hippospongia nigra (Lendenfeld, 1886) 
 Hippospongia osculata Lendenfeld, 1889
 Hippospongia pacifica (Hyatt, 1877) 
 Hippospongia seposita Wiedenmayer in Hooper & Wiedenmayer, 1994
 Hippospongia typica Lendenfeld, 1889

References

Spongiidae
Sponge genera